Mun Kyong-dok (born October 12, 1957) is a politician of the Democratic People's Republic of Korea (North Korea). As of 2011, he is the youngest member of the Political Bureau, and a candidate member of it.

Biography
Born in 1957 in Taesong-guyok, Pyongyang. In October 1973, he joined the military, graduated from Kim Il-sung University, and became a political economy expert. In Between 2010-2014, he was appointed to the Pyongyang Party Committee secretary, Vice-Chairman of the Central Committee of the Sarocheong Committee, Director of the Second Committee, and Vice-Chairman of the Party Central Committee. He was member of the funeral committee following the death of Jo Myong-rok in November 2010, death of Kim Jong-il in December 2011, Kim Kuk-thae in December 2013 and Kim Yong-chun and Kim Chol-man in 2018 and Hwang Sun-hui in 2020. In 2019 he was elected to the 14th convocation of the Supreme People's Assembly representing 280th electoral district (Kujang).

References

Members of the Supreme People's Assembly
1957 births
Living people
Kim Il-sung University alumni
Place of birth missing (living people)
Alternate members of the 6th Politburo of the Workers' Party of Korea
Members of the 6th Central Committee of the Workers' Party of Korea
Members of the 7th Central Committee of the Workers' Party of Korea
Members of the 8th Central Committee of the Workers' Party of Korea